John Sudbury was Dean  of Durham from his installation on 15 February 1661 until his death on 29 November 1684.
He was born at Bury St Edmunds in 1604, educated at Emmanuel College, Cambridge and ordained in 1629. He was Vicar of Leigh, Kent from 1639 to 1642 and a Prebendary of Westminster from 1660 to 1661.

References

Clergy from Bury St Edmunds
1604 births
1684 deaths
Alumni of Emmanuel College, Cambridge
Deans of Durham